The 2019 Copa América Final was a final match of the 46th edition of Copa América tournament that took place on 7 July 2019 at the Estádio do Maracanã in Rio de Janeiro, Brazil to determine the winner of the 2019 Copa América.

The match featured Brazil, the tournament hosts and Peru, in which Brazil won the match 3–1 to clinch their ninth Copa América title and their first since 2007.

Background

This edition was the fifth Copa América tournament hosted by Brazil. This final was the third for Peru in which they had been emerged as champions two times in their history. Their last championship (including worldwide tournaments) was won in 1975. Meanwhile, it was Brazil's nineteenth final in Copa América in which they had emerged as champions eight times. For the last time Brazil was crowned champions were in the 2007 Copa América which was hosted in Venezuela, after defeating Argentina by 3 goals to 0.

These two sides had met each other before the final on their respective group stage match where Brazil defeated Perú on a big margin of 5-0.

Route to the final

Match

Summary
Everton opened the score sheet for Brazil after 15 minutes from the kick-off with a low right footed volley from eight yards out after a Gabriel Jesus cross from the right. Peru were awarded a penalty after 44 minutes when the ball struck the hand of  Thiago Silva, with Paolo Guerrero scoring with a low shot to the right corner of the net. Brazil went back in front a minute later with a shot to the left corner of the net from inside the penalty area from Gabriel Jesus.	
Gabriel Jesus was shown a red card after 70 minutes after picking up a second yellow for jumping into the back of Carlos Zambrano. Substitute Richarlison made it 3–1 in the 90th minute with a penalty, shooting low to the left corner after Everton was fouled by Carlos Zambrano.

Details

|valign="top"|
|valign="top" width="50%"|

Statistics

References

External links

Final
2019
2019 in Brazilian football
2019 in Peruvian football
Final
2019
2019
International sports competitions in Rio de Janeiro (city)
Football in Rio de Janeiro (city)
2010s in Rio de Janeiro
July 2019 sports events in South America